Trosly-Breuil is a commune in the Oise department in northern France.

In 1964, Canadian Jean Vanier invited two men, Raphael Simi and Philippe Seux, to leave the institutions where they lived and live with him in Trosly-Breuil. Their time together led to the establishment of L'Arche at Trosly-Breuil, a community for people with disabilities to live with those who cared for them. Since that time L'Arche communities have been established in fifty countries around the world.

See also
 Communes of the Oise department

References

Communes of Oise